The Château d'Ivry-la-Bataille is a ruinous Norman castle in the town of Ivry-la-Bataille in the Normandy region. It is among the earliest examples of a stone donjon or keep, which would become a common feature of later Norman castles in various parts of Europe.

The construction of the donjon dates to around AD 1000; it was constructed by an architect named Lanfred (or Lansfred, Lanfrai) under the orders of Count Rodulf of Ivry (French: Raoul d'Ivry). According to Orderic Vitalis, Rudolf's wife, Aubrey or  Aubrée, is said to have had the architect beheaded, so that he couldn't build a similar castle for another warlord. 

The donjon has marked similarities with later Norman castle keeps, in Normandy notably Avranches, and in England notably Colchester Castle and the White Tower at the Tower of London; it has been suggested that Ivry was the model for these buildings.

The castle was reconstructed several times up to the 15th century and was repaired by Philibert de l'Orme in 1553. Only ruins now remain, but form an attractive walk overlooking the valley of the river Eure. It is an official historical monument of France (MHC).

References

External links

Castles in Eure
Ruined castles in France
Monuments historiques of Eure